The 2012 FIG Artistic Gymnastics World Cup series was a series of stages where events in men's and women's artistic gymnastics were contested.

World Cup stages

Medalists

Men

Women

See also
 2012 FIG Rhythmic Gymnastics World Cup series

References

Artistic Gymnastics World Cup
2012 in gymnastics